Sarab-e Nilufar (also Romanized as Sarāb-e Nīlūfar and Sarāb Nīlūfar) is a village in Baladarband Rural District, in the Central District of Kermanshah County, Kermanshah Province, Iran. At the 2006 census, its population was 396, in 90 families.

References 

Populated places in Kermanshah County